Jordan Rankin (born 17 December 1991) is an Australian professional rugby league footballer who plays as a  or  for the Parramatta Eels in the NRL. 

He previously played for the Gold Coast Titans and the Wests Tigers in the National Rugby League, and Hull F.C. and the Huddersfield Giants in the Super League. He spent time at Doncaster in the Championship on dual registration from Hull, as well as two separate loans from Huddersfield at the Castleford Tigers in the Betfred Super League.

Background
Rankin was born in Gold Coast, Queensland, Australia and is of Russian descent.

Playing career

Gold Coast Titans
Rankin started the 2008 season playing S. G. Ball for the Titans before he was promoted to the club's National Youth Competition team in June.

At 16 years and 238 days, Rankin became the third youngest player to make their début in Australian first-grade rugby league after coming off the bench for the Titans against the Newcastle Knights in round 22. Eastern Suburbs player Ray Stehr in 1929 and Wests' Jack Arnold in 1936 are the only two players younger than Rankin on debut. Selected for the Australian Schoolboys side to play touring teams from England and France, Rankin was required to withdraw from the representative team in order to train with the Titans squad ahead of the game.

After his debut, Rankin returned to the club's NYC team, where he would stay for the remainder of the 2008 season. Rankin later said, "I'm not going to say I wasn't thrown in too young but it was an opportunity I took ... that I was given... it is one of those things I have to live with now. Sixteen is obviously, when you look at it now, a bit young."

In August 2008, Rankin re-signed with the Titans on a three-year deal. 

Rankin didn't add to his NRL game tally in either the 2009 or 2010 seasons, instead playing in the NYC for the Titans. After 2 seasons without a single NRL game, Rankin returned in round 16 against the Cronulla-Sutherland Sharks. He later said, "I played one game and didn't play for another two years and that dents your confidence. I didn't play my natural game, I played a bit more conservative 

He played 8 NRL games during the 2011 season.

Hull F.C.
In late 2013 English Super League club Hull F.C. announced the signing of Rankin on a 2-year deal as a direct replacement for outgoing half Daniel Holdsworth. He scored a try on his Super League début against the Catalans Dragons.

Doncaster (dual registration) 
Rankin played two Championship matches for English club Doncaster in 2015.

Wests Tigers
On 15 September 2015, Rankin signed a 2-year contract to return to the National Rugby League with the Wests Tigers starting in 2016. He played on the wing in the first round match against the New Zealand Warriors, saying, "I wouldn't say it's my début all over again. I feel like I've got the opportunity now to play as a more experienced first-grade footy player." The next week, he scored his first try for the club against Manly.

Remaining on the wing, Rankin took over the team's goal-kicking duties in round 6. In round 9, he moved to fullback in the second half of the game after an injury to James Tedesco. He was awarded Man of the Match and finished with 2 tries and 7 tackle breaks.

Rankin mostly played reserve grade for Wests Tigers in 2017, making one appearance at halfback in round 11. 

Weeks later he was released to join the Huddersfield Giants immediately.

Huddersfield Giants 
In June 2017, Huddersfield Giants announced the signing of Rankin on a deal to the end of the 2017 season. New coach Rick Stone said, "The main attraction in Jordan Rankin is his ability to play in nearly every position in the back line. He's played in the outside-backs, he's played in the halves and he's played a whole NRL season on the wing." In August 2017 the move was made permanent with a three-year deal.

Castleford Tigers 
In January 2019, Rankin signed for Castleford Tigers as part of a deal that saw Joe Wardle move the other way. The deal was initially a loan for both parties, but Castleford state that there is "interest from all sides to make this a permanent move". The transfer came about as a result of a serious injury to Castleford's key halfback Luke Gale - Gale suffered a ruptured Achilles tendon in pre-season training, ruling him out for the entirety of the upcoming season. In light of this injury, the Tigers were awarded Salary Cap relief by the RFL but following the announcement of Rankin's arrival it was confirmed by Castleford Director of Rugby Jon Wells that this had not yet been made use of.

Rankin was assigned squad number 32 for the 2019 campaign, and began the season playing halfback for Castleford. Following a mid-season hamstring injury, which kept him out for 8 games, Rankin played the majority of matches at fullback. A number of good performances established him as the Tigers' first choice in this position, and he was integral in Castleford's push for the playoffs. Rankin scored a try and was voted as Fans Man of the Match for the Tigers' Elimination final victory over Warrington Wolves in the playoffs. Rankin was named as the Castleford Tigers Supporters Club committee player of the year at the end of the 2019 season.

In October 2019 Castleford confirmed that Rankin would remain at the club for the 2020 season, with Joe Wardle also remaining at Huddersfield as part of the deal. Castleford head coach Daryl Powell added: “Jordan has been outstanding for us this season and we are delighted to have him on board moving forward." Rankin was given squad number 1 for 2020, having firmly cemented himself as the Tigers' first choice fullback. He made 7 appearances throughout February and March, playing in every game for Castleford until the season was suspended due to the COVID-19 pandemic.

On 25 May 2020, it was announced that Rankin had been granted a release from both Castleford and parent club Huddersfield on compassionate grounds to allow him to return to Australia. He commented, "I'm disappointed to be cutting my time short here in the UK but my family comes first and that's always been first and foremost for me. I want to thank both clubs for giving me the opportunity to play, to play in Super League and I've really enjoyed it, my time at Cas especially. I'll always have fond memories of playing at the club and I'll always appreciate that I was given the chance."

Parramatta Eels
On 20 June 2020, Rankin signed a contract to join Parramatta. Rankin made no appearances for Parramatta in the 2020 NRL season.

In 2021 he spent time playing in the NSW Cup.

On 14 June 2022, Parramatta announced Rankin would take up a coaching role for their NSW Cup team becoming Captain/Coach.

Statistics

(* denotes season still competing)

Footnotes

External links
Castleford Tigers profile
Huddersfield Giants profile
Wests Tigers profile
Gold Coast Titans profile
SL profile

1991 births
Living people
Australian expatriate sportspeople in England
Australian rugby league coaches
Australian rugby league players
Australian people of English descent
Australian people of Ukrainian descent
Australian people of Russian descent
Burleigh Bears players
Castleford Tigers players
Doncaster R.L.F.C. players
Gold Coast Titans players
Huddersfield Giants players
Hull F.C. players
Rugby league five-eighths
Rugby league fullbacks
Rugby league halfbacks
Rugby league players from Gold Coast, Queensland
Wests Tigers NSW Cup players
Wests Tigers players